We Are One may refer to:

Music

Albums
We Are One (Maze album) (1983)
 We Are One (Pieces of a Dream album) (1982)
 We Are One, a 2007 album by Kelly Sweet or its title song

Songs
 "We Are One" (global collaboration song) (2020)
 "We Are One" (Kiss song) (1998)
 "We Are One (Ole Ola)", a 2014 song by Pitbull
 "We Are One" (Simba's Pride), a song from the 1998 film The Lion King II: Simba's Pride
 "We Are One" (Sofia Tarasova song) (2013)
 "We Are One", a 2014 song by Jena Irene Asciutto performed on American Idol
 "We Are One", a 2005 song by Buckethead from Enter the Chicken
 "We Are One", a 2017 single by Hardwell and Jolin Tsai
 "We Are One", a 2013 song by Daiki Kasho featured in Gran Turismo 6
 "We Are One", a 2013 song by Krewella from Get Wet
 "We Are One", a 1992 song by the Offspring from Ignition
 "We Are One", a 2020 song by 12 Stones from The Only Easy Day Was Yesterday
 "We Are One", a 2011 single by Verbal and Kylie Minogue
 "We Are One", a 1999 song by Westlife from Westlife
 "We Are One", the theme of the Eurovision Song Contest 2013

Other uses
 We Are One: The Obama Inaugural Celebration at the Lincoln Memorial
 We Are One (film), a 2020 documentary film
 "We are one", a motto on the U.S. Continental dollar coin of 1776 and the Fugio cent of 1787

See also
 "Together We Are One", a song by Delta Goodrem
 We Too Are One, an album by Eurythmics